The , sometimes abbreviated as Kin'yōshū, is a Japanese imperial anthology of waka whose two drafts were finished in 1124 and 1127. It was compiled at the behest of the Retired Emperor Shirakawa, by Minamoto no Shunrai (~1055–1129; sometimes called Toshiyori) It consists of ten volumes containing 716 poems.

The Kin'yō Wakashū is one of the shortest anthologies. Shunrai's unusually liberal and innovative tastes were disliked by Shirakawa, and thus Shirakawa rejected "at least two drafts". The final compromise is nevertheless remarkably contemporary and descriptive.

References

pg. 483 of Japanese Court Poetry, Earl Miner, Robert H. Brower. 1961, Stanford University Press, LCCN 61-10925

Japanese poetry anthologies
Late Old Japanese texts
Heian period in literature
12th-century Japanese books